Mongmit or Möngmit (Tai Le: ᥛᥫᥒᥰ ᥛᥤᥖ), also known as Momeik, was a Shan state in the Northern Shan States in what is today Burma. The capital was Mongmit town. The state included the townships of Mongmit and Kodaung (Kawdaw,  now Mabein Township).

History
According to tradition Mongmit has its origins in an ancient state named Gandalarattha that was founded before 1000 AD.
Mongmit, formerly part of Hsenwi State, was founded in 1238. Thirteen villages of the Mogok Stone Tract were given to Mongmit in 1420 as a reward for helping Yunnan raid Chiang Mai. In 1465, Nang Han Lung, the daughter-in-law of the Saopha (Sawbwa in Burmese) of Mongmit, sent ruby as separate tribute from Hsenwi and succeeded in keeping the former possessions of Hsenwi until 1484 when Mogok was ceded to the Burmese kings. It was however not until 1597 that the Saopha of Mongmit was forced to exchange Mogok and Kyatpyin with Tagaung, and they were formally annexed by royal edict.

Earlier in 1542, when the Shan ruler of Ava Thohanbwa (1527–1543) marched with the Saophas of Mongmit, Mongyang, Hsipaw, Mogaung, Bhamo and Yawnghwe to come to the aid of Prome against the Burmese, he was defeated by Bayinnaung. In 1544, Hkonmaing (1543-6), Saopha of Onbaung or Hsipaw and successor to Thohanbwa, attempted to regain Prome, with the help of Mongmit, Mongyang, Monè, Hsenwi, Bhamo and Yawnghwe, only to be defeated by King Tabinshwehti (1512–1550).

Bayinnaung succeeded in three campaigns, 1556–9, to reduce the Shan states of Mongmit, Mohnyin, Mogaung, Mongpai, Saga, Lawksawk, Yawnghwe, Hsipaw, Bhamo, Kalay, Chiang Mai, and Linzin, before he raided up the Taping and Shweli Rivers in 1562.

A bell donated by King Bayinnaung (1551–1581) at Shwezigon Pagoda in Bagan has inscriptions in Burmese, Pali and Mon recording the conquest of Mongmit and Hsipaw on 25 January 1557, and the building of a pagoda at Mongmit on 8 February 1557.

British rule
The Saopha of Mongmit had just died at the time of the British annexation in 1885 leaving a minor as heir, and the administration at Mongmit was weak. It was included under the jurisdiction of the Commissioner of the Northern Division instead of the Superintendent of the Northern Shan States. A pretender named Hkam Leng came to claim the title, but he was rejected by the ministers. A Burmese prince called Saw Yan Naing, who had risen up against the British, fled to the area and joined forces with Hkam Leng, and caused a great deal of problems during 1888–9 to the Hampshire Regiment stationed at Mongmit.

Sao Hkun Hkio, Saopha of Mongmit, was one of the seven Saophas on the executive committee of the Shan State Council formed after the first Panglong Conference in March 1946. On 16 January 1947, they sent two memoranda, whilst a Burmese delegation headed by Aung San was in London, to the British Labour government of Clement Attlee demanding equal political footing as Burma proper and full autonomy of the Federated Shan States. He was not one of the six Saophas who signed the Panglong Agreement on 12 February 1947. The Cambridge-educated Sao Hkun Hkio however became the longest serving Foreign Minister of Burma after independence in 1948 until the military coup of Ne Win in 1962, with only short interruptions, the longest one of which being between 1958 and 1960 during Ne Win's caretaker government.

Rulers
The rulers of Mongmit bore the title of Saohpa; their ritual style was Gantalarahta Maha Thiriwuntha Raza.

Saophas

 60?–6??: Hkun Han Hpa (6th son of Hkun Lu)
 939–9??: Sao Ngan Hpa 
 1122–1168: Hkun Hkam Kyen Hken Hpa 
 1168–1185: Hkun Ta Ka 
 1185–1250: Hkun Kome 
 1250–1308: Hkun Yi Khwai Hkam 
 1308–1310: Hkun Hpo Srang Kang 
 1310–1345: Hkun Tai Hkone 
 1345–1380: Hkun Tai Khaing  
 1380–1393: Hkam Plew 
 Hkam Wad Hpa 
 Hso Loeng Hkam
 Hso Hkoen Möng 
 Hso Kyaung Hpa 
 Hso Hom Möng 
 1450–1487: Hso Oum Hpa 
 1487–1530: Sao Sai Möng 
 1530–1550: Hkam Hsan Hpa
 1550–1564: Ngoek Sieng Hpa 
 1564–1568: Hpong Ni Sa 
 1568–1594: Tein-nyin-sa Saing Hkan
 1594–1600: Hkam Hkon Hpa
 1600–1628: Hso Hung Hpa
 1628–1650: Sao Piam Hpa 
 Hso Hpa Pa
 Sao Ngauk Hpa
 Hso Ngan Hpa
 Sao Muak Hpa
 Hso Hon Hpa 
 Hso Han Hpa
 Hso Paad Hpa 
 Hkun Hkam Sunt 
 Hkun Hkam Loeng
 Vacant
 1830–1837; Sao Mawkmai (Sao Mei Hkam)
 1837–1851: Sao Möng Einth  
 1851–1858: Sao Hkun Te
 1858–1861: Sao Haw Kyin
 1862–1868: Sao Möng Nyunt 
 1868–1874: Sao Hkam Möng 
 1874–1886: Vacant
 1886–1887: Sao Hkam Loeng 
 31 January 1887 – 3 February 1937: Sao Khine Möng Kwe 
 3 February 1937 – 1952: Sao Hkun Hkio (b. 1912)

References

External links

19th century in Burma
Shan States